Ipswich Community Radio (ICR FM) is a community radio station in Ipswich, Suffolk. It was awarded a full-time FM licence in 2006, and began broadcasting on 105.7 FM in 2007.

The basic format of the station is to provide an output that is not in the mainstream and give people open opportunities to be on air through training courses. Content includes alternative music genres, speech and other locally sourced programmes.

Ipswich Community Radio broadcasts its live content from Turret Lane in Ipswich and transmits from the Chantry area, covering Ipswich and parts of Kesgrave, along with parts of north Essex.

In 2015, the station was added to the RadioPlayer platform.

In 2016, the station went through a lot of major changes including the move of the transmitter after 2015 building work meant a reduction in coverage. April 2016, this was rectified and the full service on FM is now restored. The station has now noticeably moved to icrfm.com on the web too.

In late 2016, the station launched ICR XMAS, a 24-hour Christmas music station, and then in 2017 launched online station ICR Flip.

References

Radio stations in Suffolk
Community radio stations in the United Kingdom
Companies based in Ipswich